Zulkifli Che Ros (born ) is a Malaysian male weightlifter from Sarawak, competing in the 77 kg category and representing Malaysia at international competitions. He competed at world championships, most recently at the 2007 World Weightlifting Championships.

Major results

References

1985 births
Living people
People from Sarawak
Malaysian people of Malay descent
Malaysian Muslims
Malaysian male weightlifters
Place of birth missing (living people)
Weightlifters at the 2010 Commonwealth Games
Commonwealth Games competitors for Malaysia
Southeast Asian Games silver medalists for Malaysia
Southeast Asian Games medalists in weightlifting
Competitors at the 2009 Southeast Asian Games
21st-century Malaysian people